Obaid Siddiqi FRS (7 January 1932 – 26 July 2013) was an Indian National Research Professor and the Founder-Director of the Tata Institute of Fundamental Research (TIFR) National Center for Biological Sciences. He made seminal contributions to the field of behavioural neurogenetics using the genetics and neurobiology of Drosophila.

Early life and education
Obaid Siddiqi was born in 1932 in Basti district of Uttar Pradesh. He received his early education at Aligarh Muslim University where he completed 
his M.Sc. He completed his Ph.D. at the University of Glasgow, under the supervision of Guido Pontecorvo. He carried out his post doctoral research at the Cold Spring Harbor Laboratory, and University of Pennsylvania. He was invited by Homi Bhabha to set up the molecular biology unit at the Tata Institute of Fundamental Research (TIFR) in Bombay in 1962. Thirty years later, he became the founding director of the TIFR National Center for Biological Sciences in Bangalore, where he would continue his research into his final days of life.

Research
Siddiqi's studies in the field of neurogenetics unravelled the link between genes, behaviour and the brain. In the 1970s, his work with Seymour Benzer at Caltech led to the discovery of temperature-sensitive paralytic Drosophila mutants and the generation and transmission of neural signals. This heralded the dawn of the field of neurogenetics.

At TIFR, Siddiqi and his graduate student, Veronica Rodrigues, isolated and characterized the first collection of mutants with defects in smell and taste in Drosophila. Siddiqi's work in neurogenetics led to the foundational advances in understanding how taste and smell are detected and encoded in the brain.

Awards and honours
President of the Indian Academy of Sciences
Member, Royal Society, London
Member, US National Academy of Sciences, Washington
Member, Third World Academy, Trieste
Visiting professorships at Yale University
Visiting Professor, Massachusetts Institute of Technology
Visiting Professor, The California Institute of Technology
Visiting Professor, Cambridge University
Twice Sherman Fairchild Distinguished Scholar at Caltech
Sir Syed Ahmad Khan International Award for Life Sciences 2009
Padma Vibhushan, 2006
Dr. B. C. Roy Award, 2004
Sir Syed Life Time Achievement Award, AMUAA New York, 2004
Pride of India Award, AFMI, USA, 2004
INSA Aryabhata Medal 1992;
Goyal Prize 1991;
Birla Smarak Kosh National Award 1989;
Padma Bhushan 1984;
Bhatnagar Award 1976;
Life member of Clare Hall, Cambridge.
Honorary D.Sc., Aligarh Muslim University, Aligarh
Honorary D.Sc., Banaras Hindu University, Benaras
Honorary D.Sc., Jamia Hamdard, Delhi
Honorary D.Sc., Kalyani University, Kalyani
Honorary D.Sc., Indian Institute of Technology, Bombay
Honorary D.Sc., Jamia Milia, Delhi
Honorary D.Sc., Central University of Hyderabad

Legacy
Siddiqi died on 26 July 2013 in Bangalore following a freak road accident on 21 July 2013 which caused severe damage to the brain. He is survived by his wife Asiya, sons Imran and Kaleem, and daughters Yumna and Diba.

Selected publications

Siddiqi, O. (1983) Olfactory Neurogenetics of Drosophila.  Symposium on Neurogenetics.  XV International Congress of Genetics.  Genetics: New Frontiers. Oxford, Delhi.  Vol. III 243–261.

Siddiqi, O. (1988) Genetic Variation in Drosophila chemoreception.  Genetics and Immunology of Chemical Communication.  Monell Research Center, Philadelphia.
Ayyub, C., Paranjape, J., Rodrigues, V. & Siddiqi, O. (1990). Genetics of olfactory behavior in Drosophila melanogaster. J. Neurogenet. 6: 243–262.
Siddiqi, O.(1990) Olfaction in Drosophila. Chemical senses Vol. 3 Eds. Wyzocki et al. Marcel Dekker, NY, 79–96.
Jayaram, V.C. and Siddiqi, O. (1997). gustJ a salt insensitive mutant of Drosophila.  Journal of Genetics, 76: 133–145.
Bala, A.D.S., Panchal, P. and Siddiqi, O. (1998).  Osmotaropotaxis in the larva of Drosophila melanogaster.  Current science, 75: 48–51.
Mistry, Y., R. Mistry, and O. Siddiqi, O. (2000). Evidence of age-related changes in the antennal glomeruli of Drosophila melanogaster using monoclonal antibodies. Arthropod Structure and Development. Vol.29 (2) 101–110.
Khurana S, Abu Baker MB, Siddiqi O. (2009). Odour avoidance learning in the larva of Drosophila melanogaster. J. Biosci. 34: 621–631.
Chakraborty TS, Goswami S.P, Siddiqi O. (2009). Sensory correlates of imaginal conditioning in Drosophila melanogaster. J. Neurogenet. 23: 210–219.
Iyengar A, Chakraborty TS, Goswami SP, Wu CF, Siddiqi O.(2010) Post-eclosion odor experience modifies olfactory neuron coding in Drosophila. Proc. Natl. Acad. Sci. U S A. 107(21):9855-60.

References

External links
Obaid Siddiqi's publications on PubMed

1932 births
2013 deaths
Alumni of the University of Glasgow
Fellows of the Indian Academy of Sciences
Fellows of the Indian National Science Academy
Fellows of The National Academy of Sciences, India
Fellows of the Royal Society
Indian institute directors
Indian geneticists
Foreign associates of the National Academy of Sciences
Academic staff of the National Centre for Biological Sciences
Scientists from Uttar Pradesh
Recipients of the Padma Bhushan in science & engineering
Recipients of the Padma Vibhushan in science & engineering
Recipients of the Shanti Swarup Bhatnagar Award in Biological Science
Aligarh Muslim University alumni
Dr. B. C. Roy Award winners
20th-century Indian biologists